Jhon César Mosquera Rivas (born 26 January 1992) is a Colombian footballer who plays as a midfielder for Equatorial Guinean club Futuro Kings FC.

References

1992 births
Living people
Association football midfielders
Colombian footballers
Sportspeople from Valle del Cauca Department
Categoría Primera A players
Águilas Doradas Rionegro players
Jaguares de Córdoba footballers
Peruvian Primera División players
Sport Boys footballers
Peruvian Segunda División players
Serrato Pacasmayo players
Sport Loreto players
Liga Panameña de Fútbol players
Unión Deportivo Universitario players
Futuro Kings FC players
Colombian expatriate footballers
Colombian expatriate sportspeople in Peru
Expatriate footballers in Peru
Colombian expatriate sportspeople in Panama
Expatriate footballers in Panama
Colombian expatriates in Equatorial Guinea
Expatriate footballers in Equatorial Guinea